Region 10 or Region X can refer to:

 Former Region 10 (Johannesburg), an administrative district in the city of Johannesburg, South Africa, from 2000 to 2006
Los Lagos Region, Chile
Northern Mindanao Region, Philippines

Region name disambiguation pages